The NWA Wildside United States Heavyweight Championship was a title contested for in the National Wrestling Alliance-member promotion NWA Wildside.

The title was originally the NCW United States Heavyweight Championship from 1995 through 1999, when National Championship Wrestling became NWA Wildside. The championship lasted through November 2000 when it was unified with the NWA National Heavyweight Championship. Wildside revived the title in February 2004 and it remained until the promotion closed in April 2005.

Title history
Silver areas in the history indicate periods of unknown lineage.

See also
NWA Wildside

References

External links
Wrestling-Titles.com

National Wrestling Alliance championships
NWA Wildside championships
Heavyweight wrestling championships
United States professional wrestling championships